Bruce Sibanda (born 6 May 1995) is a Zimbabwean first-class cricketer who plays for Matabeleland Tuskers.

References

External links
 

1995 births
Living people
Zimbabwean cricketers
Matabeleland Tuskers cricketers
Place of birth missing (living people)